Anthony Thomas (born 30 August 1982) is an English footballer who plays as a striker for Egham Town.

Career
His career began at Hemel Hempstead Town, where he scored 72 goals in two seasons. His first goal for Barnet came against Dagenham & Redbridge, and burst a hole in the side netting. He was loaned out to Cambridge City in October 2007, and was released at the end of the season. Thomas then joined Stevenage Borough on 17 May 2008. He struggled to make the first team and rejoined Hemel Hempstead Town after 11 appearances, scoring a brace in his first game against Yate Town.

On 27 January 2012 he joined Bromley, scoring on his debut in their 3–0 win over Weston-Super-Mare, helping Bromley win their first game since October. He subsequently played for Wingate & Finchley, and in June 2013 signed for Hendon. He went on to join Canvey Island a year later before joining Ryman League side Ware in early 2015. In August 2016, Thomas joined Uxbridge. He signed for Egham Town in March 2019.

Personal life
In February 2009, Thomas, and his then partner, were banned from owning a dog for 10 years and given three-month sentences after neglecting and beating a puppy over a three-month period in 2007, leaving the seven-month-old puppy suffering a broken back, cracked ribs and severe bruising. Just one week earlier, Thomas was given a two-year conditional discharge at Snaresbrook Crown Court after being convicted of assault for beating up a motorist in a 2007 road rage attack.

References

External links

Anthony Thomas at Aylesbury United
Anthony Thomas at FA Full Time

1982 births
Living people
Footballers from Hammersmith
English footballers
Association football forwards
Hemel Hempstead Town F.C. players
Barnet F.C. players
Cambridge City F.C. players
Stevenage F.C. players
Farnborough F.C. players
Hendon F.C. players
Slough Town F.C. players
Brackley Town F.C. players
Maidenhead United F.C. players
Bromley F.C. players
Lewes F.C. players
Wingate & Finchley F.C. players
Beaconsfield Town F.C. players
Canvey Island F.C. players
Ware F.C. players
Chalfont St Peter A.F.C. players
Uxbridge F.C. players
Hatfield Town F.C. players
Egham Town F.C. players
English Football League players
National League (English football) players
Isthmian League players
Southern Football League players